Ross Dunkerton OAM (born 16 July 1945) is an Australian rally driver. Dunkerton is a 5 time Australian Rally Champion and 2 time Asian Pacific Rally Champion. He was awarded a Medal of the Order of Australia (OAM) in 2018.

Dunkerton is one of only three Australian rally drivers in history to achieve FIA A seeded status (the others being Chris Atkinson and Cody Crocker), and is arguably Australia’s most successful.

Dunkerton was awarded life membership with CAMS in 2011, inducted into the Australian Rally Hall of Fame in 2013 and the Australian Motor Sport Hall of Fame in 2016.

 

Dunkerton won the Asia-Pacific Rally Championship in 1991 and 1992 in a Mitsubishi Galant VR-4 as a full-time factory driver for Mitsubishi Ralliart.  In Australia, he won the Australian Rally Championship in 1975, '76, '77, '79 and '83 in Datsun 1600s, 240Zs and 260Zs. Dunkerton also won the Southern Cross Rally in 1980. He won the 2005 and 2006 Targa West rallies, placing third in the 2007 event.

Personal life
Born in Fremantle, Western Australia, he was previously a councillor for the Town of Bassendean, but moved with his family to Cairns in Far North Queensland in late 2007.

Ross is married to his wife Lisa has two sons, Aaron and Flynn.

Career
Dunkerton is a regular competitor in numerous tarmac and historic gravel events in both Australia and New Zealand. He competed in the 2009 Otago Rally of New Zealand in his newly purchased MK II BDA Ford Escort rally car.

Dunkerton is one of only two Australian drivers to have ever stood on a podium of a World Rally Championship event, the other being Chris Atkinson. In 1992, Dunkerton finished third in the Rothmans Rally of New Zealand, round 7 of the 1992 World Rally Championship.

Television presenting 
After winning almost 100 rallies in a career spanning three decades, former International Rally Driver Ross Dunkerton turned his hand to full-time television presenting in 1995.

In 1997, Dunkerton won a National Media award, testimony to the adage that he brings to television, the same determination, wit and effort that saw him enjoy so much success in his sporting career.

Dunkerton has taken on many roles, his most current being a full-time presenter for the Western Australian lifestyle show, Home in WA and the automotive series, Zoom TV. He has also presented coverage for a variety of motorsport events including the Variety Club Bash and coverage of the Australian Rally Championship on network ten.

Career results

References

External links
Contact details at local government website
Results and profile, Rallybase.nl
 https://web.archive.org/web/20120812011210/http://www.rossdunkertonrally.com/

Australian rally drivers
1945 births
Living people
Sportspeople from Fremantle
Racing drivers from Western Australia